Château de Ferrières is a French château built between 1855 and 1859 for Baron James de Rothschild in the Goût Rothschild style located in central France, some 26 km east of Paris. Rothschild ownership of the Château de Ferrières was passed down through the male line according to the rule of primogeniture, until it was donated by the family in 1975 to the University of Paris. Considered to be the largest and most luxurious 19th-century château in France, it can be reached from Rue Rucherie in the town of Ferrières-en-Brie in the Seine-et-Marne department.

Early history
Sitting at the crest of a long entry drive, the château was designed by the British architect Joseph Paxton.  The inspiration for the design of Ferrières was Mentmore Towers in Buckinghamshire, England, the house that Paxton had built for Baron James's nephew, Mayer Amschel de Rothschild. On seeing Mentmore, Baron James is reputed to have summoned Paxton and ordered him to "Build me a Mentmore, but twice the size".

Built in the Neo-Renaissance style inspired by the architecture of the Italian Renaissance, with square towers at each corner, the house sits on a formal terrace that gives way to 1.25 km² of gardens in a parkland landscaped à l'anglaise that was part of a surrounding 30 km² forest contained in the estate. The sculpting of the interior atlas columns and caryatids was by Charles Henri Joseph Cordier, and the decorative painting was supervised by Eugène Lami. The massive library held more than 8,000 volumes. Because lavish entertaining was important, in addition to the private Rothschild apartments, the Château de Ferrières was built with eighty guest suites. Ferrières was inaugurated 16 December 1862 with a gala attended by Napoleon III.

Baron James acquired a vast collection of works of art, and statues adorned a number of the château's rooms. Several of the many sculptures were by Alexandre Falguière and the 18th-century Italian, Antonio Corradini and the Baron's son later added works by René de Saint-Marceaux.

During the Franco-Prussian War of 1870-71, the Château de Ferrières was seized by the Germans and was the site of negotiations between Otto von Bismarck, Chancellor of the North German Confederation, and the French Minister of Foreign Affairs, Jules Favre. The Germans again seized the château during the occupation of France in World War II, and this time, they looted its vast art collections.

The château remained empty until 1959, when Guy de Rothschild and his new wife, Marie-Hélène de Zuylen van Nyevelt, set about refurbishing it. From 1959, they hosted regular parties at the château, the theme of which would be personally designed by artists or designers such as Yves Saint Laurent. Their parties would mainly consist of aristocrats, but they always included many of her friends from a wider society, such as Brigitte Bardot, Grace Kelly and Audrey Hepburn.

Recent history
In 1975, Guy de Rothschild and his wife charitably donated the château to the chancellery of the University of Paris.

The property is now used as a school called "École Ferrières" (Ferrières School), which opened in late 2015 and focuses on gastronomy and the hospitality industry. There are also two restaurants on site, named "Le Baron" and "Le Chai".

In popular culture

Several episodes of Highlander: The Series and Highlander: The Raven were filmed at the château between 1995 and 1999
Scenes in the Roman Polanski film The Ninth Gate (2000) were filmed at the château in 1998
An episode of the TV series Relic Hunter (1999-2002) was filmed at the château
The music video of American singer Beyoncé’s song "Partition" was filmed at the château in 2013
The music video of French singer Indila's song "Tourner dans le vide" was filmed at the château in 2014

References

External links
 
 École Ferrières - official website

Châteaux in Seine-et-Marne
Monuments historiques of Île-de-France
Rothschild family residences
Joseph Paxton buildings and structures
Buildings and structures completed in 1859